Orlando Sánchez may refer to:

Orlando Sánchez (baseball) (born 1956), Puerto Rican baseball player
Orlando Sánchez (basketball) (born 1988), Dominican basketball player
Orlando Sanchez (politician) (born 1957), American politician
Orlando Sanchez (fighter)